The Saxby Gale was a tropical cyclone which struck eastern Canada's Bay of Fundy region on the night of October 4–5, 1869. The storm was named for Lieutenant Stephen Martin Saxby, a naval instructor who, based on his astronomical studies, had predicted extremely high tides in the North Atlantic Ocean on October 1, 1869, which would produce storm surges in the event of a storm.

Effects

The hurricane caused extensive destruction to port facilities and communities along the Bay of Fundy coast in both New Brunswick and Nova Scotia as well as Maine, particularly Calais, St. Andrews, St. George, Saint John, Moncton, Sackville, Amherst, Windsor and Truro.

Much of the devastation was attributed to a two-metre storm surge created by the storm which coincided with a perigean spring tide; the Bay of Fundy having one of the highest tidal ranges in the world. The Saxby Gale storm surge produced a water level which gave Burntcoat Head, Nova Scotia, the honor of having the highest tidal range ever recorded. It is also thought to have formed the long gravel beach that connects Partridge Island, Nova Scotia, to the mainland.

The storm also produced waves which, combined with the storm surge, breached dikes protecting low-lying farmland in the Minas Basin and the Tantramar Marshes, sending ocean waters surging far inland to inundate farms and communities. Sailing ships in various harbors were tossed about and/or broken up against wharves and breakwaters which were also destroyed. Farmers trying to rescue livestock from fields along shorelines drowned after dikes were breached. There were at least 37 deaths between Maine, New Brunswick, and New York. The gale destroyed miles of the newly completed Windsor and Annapolis Railway along the Minas Basin near Horton and Wolfville, Nova Scotia.

Naming of the storm
The storm (which pre-dated the practice of naming hurricanes) was given the name "Saxby" in honor of Lieutenant Stephen Martin Saxby, Royal Navy, who was a naval instructor and amateur astronomer.  Lt. Saxby had written a letter of warning, published December 25, 1868, in London's The Standard newspaper in which he notes the astronomical forces predicted for October 5, 1869, which would produce extremely high tides in the North Atlantic Ocean during the height of hurricane season.  Lt. Saxby followed this warning with a reminder published on September 16, 1869, to The Standard in which he also warns of a major "atmospheric disturbance" that would coincide with the high water level at an undetermined location.  Many newspapers took up Saxby's warning in the coming days.

In a monthly weather column published October 5, 1869, in Halifax's The Evening Express, amateur meteorologist Frederick Allison relayed Lt. Saxby's warning for a devastating storm the following week.

Despite the warning, many readers throughout the United Kingdom, Canada, Newfoundland and the United States dismissed Saxby since there were frequent gales and hurricanes during the month of October.  The fact that the high tides occurred throughout the North Atlantic basin was unremarkable and astronomically predictable, except for their coinciding with the hurricane which struck the Gulf of Maine and Bay of Fundy to produce the devastating storm surge.  Lt. Saxby's predictions were considered quite lunatic at the time. Some believed that his predictions were founded upon astrology, which was not the case.

Letter to the Editor, Dec. 25, 1868

Letter to the Editor, Sept. 16, 1869

Op-Ed Column, Oct. 1, 1869

See also 

List of tropical cyclones
List of Atlantic hurricanes
List of New England hurricanes

References

 The Saxby Gale
 The SAXBY GALE of 1869
 Geological Survey of Canada (Atlantic) – The Saxby Gale of 1869: A case study of flood water levels in Truro, Nova Scotia, Canada
 Meteorological Service of Canada (Canadian Hurricane Centre) – 1869, The Saxby Gale, New Brunswick, and Nova Scotia
 The Weather Network – Saxby Gale 

1860s Atlantic hurricane seasons
1869 Saxby
1869 Saxby
1869 Saxby
1869 Saxby
1869 Saxby
1869 Saxby
Saxby Gale
Saxby Gale
October 1869 events
1869 natural disasters
1869 meteorology